Robert Schäfer (born 23 March 1976) is a German attorney and manager. From 2010 to 2013 he was managing director of German football club 1860 Munich. From 2014 to 2016 he was managing director of SG Dynamo Dresden. From 22 March 2016 until 15 April 2019 he was president of Fortuna Düsseldorf.

External links
 http://www.abendzeitung-muenchen.de/inhalt.tsv-1860-1860-bestaetigt:-robert-schaefer-neuer-geschaeftsfuehrer.cafe0523-a5b6-42a5-81ec-546db45ea16d.html
 http://www.tsv1860.de/tsv-1860/kgaa/die-kgaa

Living people
German jurists
German football managers
1976 births
Place of birth missing (living people)